Johann Funk (December 26, 1836 – March 15, 1917) was a Mennonite bishop in early Canadian history.

Funk was born on the Bergthal Colony, a Mennonite settlement near Mariupol, Yekaterinoslav Governorate, Russian Empire (Today Ukraine) in 1836.  In 1874, bishop Gerhard Wiebe persuaded the colony to emigrate to Canada.  Funk was ordained a bishop in Canada in 1892, and played a significant role in the development of Mennonite education and the formation of Mennonite Collegiate Institute in Gretna, Manitoba.

Funk died in 1917 in Altbergthal, near Altona, Manitoba.

References
 
Global Anabaptist Mennonite Encyclopedia Online entry on Bergthal Mennonites

1836 births
1917 deaths
Canadian bishops
Canadian Mennonites
Mennonite ministers
People from Pembina Valley Region, Manitoba
Ukrainian emigrants to Canada
19th-century Anabaptist ministers
20th-century Anabaptist ministers
Emigrants from the Russian Empire to Canada